The 2011 French Open was a tennis tournament played on outdoor clay courts. It was the 115th edition of the French Open, and the second Grand Slam event of the year. It took place at the Stade Roland Garros in Paris, France, from 22 May to 5 June 2011.

Rafael Nadal successfully defended his 2010 title, defeating rival Roger Federer in the final to win his sixth French Open title. Francesca Schiavone was narrowly unsuccessful in her title defence, being defeated by Li Na in the final. Li became the first female Asian to win a Grand Slam singles title.

Tournament

The 2011 French Open was the one hundred and tenth edition of the French Open. It was held at Stade Roland Garros in Paris. The tournament was an event run by the International Tennis Federation (ITF) and was part of the 2011 ATP World Tour and the 2011 WTA Tour calendars under the Grand Slam category. The tournament consisted of both men's and women's singles and doubles draws as well as a mixed doubles event. There were singles and doubles events for both boys and girls (players under 18), which is part of the Grade A category of tournaments. There were also singles and doubles events for men's and women's wheelchair tennis players as part of the NEC tour under the Grand Slam category. The tournament was played on clay courts. The tournament took place over a series of twenty courts, including the three main showcourts, Court Philippe Chatrier, Court Suzanne Lenglen and Court 1.

Ranking points

Senior ranking points

Junior ranking points

Below is a table charting the points that are available to the boys and girls in boy singles and doubles play.

Wheelchair ranking points

Prize money and points
The total amount of prize money available for the 2011 tournament was €17,520,000. The prize money breakdown was as follows:

* per team

Men's and women's wheelchair singles

 Winners: €15,000
 Runners-up: €7,500
 Semi-finalists: €4,000
 Quarter-finalists: €2,500

Men's and women's wheelchair doubles

 Winners: €5,000
 Runners-up: €2,500
 Semi-finalists: €1,500

Singles players

Men's singles

Women's singles

Day-by-day summaries

Events

Seniors

Men's singles

 Rafael Nadal defeated  Roger Federer 7–5, 7–6(7–3), 5–7, 6–1
In the final, Nadal won his sixth French Open title with a victory over the world number three to hold his title. It was Nadal's third title of the year and 46th of his career. It was the first slam he had won this year and the tenth of his career.

Women's singles

 Li Na defeated  Francesca Schiavone, 6–4, 7–6(7–0)
In the final Li Na played the defending champion Francesca Schiavone and won in straight sets. In the final tiebreak game Li won 7–0. It was Li's 2nd title of the year and 5th of her career. Li became the first Chinese and the first Asian winner of a singles Grand Slam tennis tournament. It was Li's second Grand Slam final, after she reached the final of the 2011 Australian Open. After her victory Li Na said that "everyone in China will be so excited".

Men's doubles

 Max Mirnyi /  Daniel Nestor defeated  Juan Sebastián Cabal /  Eduardo Schwank, 7–6(7–3), 3–6, 6–4
Mirnyi and Nestor both won their third French Open men's doubles title; Mirnyi won his fifth Grand Slam men's doubles title, and Nestor his seventh.

Women's doubles

 Andrea Hlaváčková /  Lucie Hradecká defeated  Sania Mirza /  Elena Vesnina, 6–4, 6–3
Hlaváčková and Hradecká both won their first Grand Slam title.

Mixed doubles

 Casey Dellacqua /  Scott Lipsky defeated  Katarina Srebotnik /  Nenad Zimonjić, 7–6(8–6), 4–6, [10–7]
Dellacqua and Lipsky both won their first Grand Slam title.

Juniors

Boys' singles

 Bjorn Fratangelo defeated  Dominic Thiem, 3–6, 6–3, 8–6
Fratangelo won his first junior Grand Slam title. He is the first American to win the junior title since John McEnroe's junior title in 1977.

Girls' singles

 Ons Jabeur defeated  Monica Puig, 7–6(10–8), 6–1
Jabeur won her first junior Grand Slam title.

Boys' doubles

 Andrés Artuñedo /  Roberto Carballés defeated  Mitchell Krueger /  Shane Vinsant, 5–7, 7–6(7–5), [10–5]
Artunedo and Carballes both won their first junior Grand Slam title.

Girls' doubles

 Irina Khromacheva /  Maryna Zanevska defeated  Victoria Kan /  Demi Schuurs, 6–4, 7–5
Khromacheva won her first junior Grand Slam doubles title, and Zanevska won her second.

Wheelchair events

Wheelchair men's singles

 Maikel Scheffers defeated  Nicolas Peifer, 7–6(7–3), 6–3
Scheffers won his first Grand Slam title.

Wheelchair women's singles

 Esther Vergeer defeated  Marjolein Buis, 6–0, 6–2
Vergeer won her fifth consecutive French Open singles title and her 18th Grand Slam singles title.

Wheelchair men's doubles

 Shingo Kunieda /  Nicolas Peifer defeated  Robin Ammerlaan /  Stefan Olsson, 6–2, 6–3
Kunieda won his third French Open doubles title, and tenth Grand Slam doubles title.
Peifer won his first Grand Slam title.

Wheelchair women's doubles

 Esther Vergeer /  Sharon Walraven defeated  Jiske Griffioen /  Aniek van Koot, 5–7, 6–4, [10–5]
Vergeer won her fourth French Open doubles title, and 17th Grand Slam doubles title.
Walraven won her fourth consecutive Grand Slam title.

Other events

Legends under 45 doubles

 Fabrice Santoro /  Todd Woodbridge defeated  Arnaud Boetsch /  Cédric Pioline, 6–2, 6–4

Legends over 45 doubles

 Guy Forget /  Henri Leconte defeated  Andrés Gómez /  John McEnroe, 6–3, 5–7, [10–8]

Women's legends doubles

 Lindsay Davenport /  Martina Hingis defeated  Martina Navratilova /  Jana Novotná, 6–1, 6–2

Singles seeds 
The following are the seeded players and notable players who withdrew from the event. Rankings are as of 16 May 2011 and the Points are as of 23 May 2011. For the first time since the 2006 French Open, the top four seeds all made it to the semifinals.
 Men's singles 

Withdrawn players

 Women's singles 

Withdrawn players

Wildcard entries
Below are the lists of the wildcard awardees entering in the main draws.

Men's singles wildcard entries
  Tim Smyczek
  Bernard Tomic
  Arnaud Clément
  Benoît Paire
  Maxime Teixeira
  Édouard Roger-Vasselin
  Guillaume Rufin
  Vincent Millot

Women's singles wildcard entries
  Casey Dellacqua
  Irina Falconi
  Pauline Parmentier
  Caroline Garcia
  Kristina Mladenovic
  Iryna Brémond
  Stéphanie Foretz Gacon
  Olivia Sanchez

Men's doubles wildcard entries
  Kenny de Schepper /  Albano Olivetti
  Jérémy Chardy /  Arnaud Clément
  Gaël Monfils /  Josselin Ouanna
  Marc Gicquel /  Édouard Roger-Vasselin
  Pierre-Hugues Herbert /  Nicolas Renavand
  Guillaume Rufin /  Alexandre Sidorenko
  Olivier Patience /  Éric Prodon

Women's doubles wildcard entries
  Julie Coin /  Mathilde Johansson
  Irena Pavlovic /  Laura Thorpe
  Caroline Garcia /  Aurélie Védy
  Kristina Mladenovic /  Pauline Parmentier
  Claire Feuerstein /  Stéphanie Foretz Gacon
  Victoria Larrière /  Alizé Lim
  Audrey Bergot /  Iryna Brémond

Mixed doubles wildcard entries
  Julie Coin /  Nicolas Mahut
  Alizé Cornet /  Gilles Simon
  Alizé Lim /  Richard Gasquet (withdrew to focus on Gasquet's singles match)
  Amélie Mauresmo /  Michaël Llodra (withdrew)
  Virginie Razzano /  Dick Norman
  Aravane Rezaï /  Grigor Dimitrov

Protected ranking
The following players were accepted directly into the main draw using a protected ranking: 

Men's Singles
  Tommy Haas
  Ivo Karlović

Women's Singles
  Viktoriya Kutuzova

Qualifiers entries

Men's singles qualifiers entries

  Frank Dancevic
  Steve Darcis
  Alejandro Falla
  Augustin Gensse
  Denis Gremelmayr
  David Guez
  Łukasz Kubot
  Javier Martí
  Leonardo Mayer
  Björn Phau
  Éric Prodon
  Albert Ramos
  Stéphane Robert
  Lukáš Rosol
  Thomas Schoorel
  Antonio Veić

The following players received entry from a lucky loser spot:
  Andreas Beck
  Alex Bogomolov Jr.
  Simone Bolelli
  Marc Gicquel
  Ryan Harrison 
  Marsel İlhan

Women's singles qualifiers entries

  Mona Barthel
  Chan Yung-jan
  Eleni Daniilidou
  Corinna Dentoni
  Marina Erakovic
  Olga Govortsova
  Sabine Lisicki
  Nuria Llagostera Vives
  Sílvia Soler Espinosa
  Sloane Stephens
  Heather Watson
  Aleksandra Wozniak

The following player received entry from a lucky loser spot:
  Anastasia Pivovarova

Withdrawals
The following players were accepted directly into the main tournament, but withdrew with injuries.

Men's Singles
  Benjamin Becker → replaced by  Ryan Harrison
  Ričardas Berankis → replaced by  Marsel İlhan
  Juan Carlos Ferrero → replaced by  Andreas Beck
  Fernando González → replaced by  Brian Dabul
  Lleyton Hewitt → replaced by  Marc Gicquel
  Paul-Henri Mathieu → replaced by  Jan Hájek
  David Nalbandian → replaced by  Daniel Brands
  Tommy Robredo → replaced by  Alex Bogomolov Jr.
  Andy Roddick → replaced by  Simone Bolelli

Women's Singles
  Timea Bacsinszky → replaced by  Anna Tatishvili
  Anna Chakvetadze → replaced by  Vesna Dolonts
  Alisa Kleybanova → replaced by  Anastasia Pivovarova
  Dinara Safina → replaced by  Anne Keothavong
  Serena Williams → replaced by  Junri Namigata
  Venus Williams → replaced by  Kateryna Bondarenko

References

External links

Official website